More is a printed punk magazine from Belgium. The magazine was started in 1977 and is published monthly.

Staff
 Bert Bertrand
 Nadine Milo
 Pascal Stevens
 Gilles Verlant

See also
 List of magazines in Belgium

1977 establishments in Belgium
Magazines published in Belgium
Magazines established in 1977
Monthly magazines published in Belgium
Music magazines